Harry Melrose (born 31 May 1935) is a Scottish former professional football player and manager.

Club career
A winger, Melrose started his playing career for Rangers. His only appearance for the Gers was in the Scottish League Cup semi-final in September 1957, scoring twice in a 4–0 win over Brechin City.

He made his name at Dunfermline Athletic after arriving on a free transfer in May 1958.  A stalwart of Jock Stein's side of the early 60's, he made 271 appearances and scored 106 goals, including 6 goals, (a joint club record shared with Charlie Dickson) in a game against Partick Thistle in April 1959.

He left East End Park in October 1965 and signed for Aberdeen for a fee of £10,000. He was captain of the Dons from 1966 to 1968.

Managerial career
In 1969, he left Pittodrie and became player-manager of Berwick Rangers. In 1975, he returned to Dunfermline as manager and guided them to promotion to Scottish League Division One in May 1979.

External links
 Dunfermline hall of fame
 

Melrose, Harrye
Living people
Scottish football managers
Scottish footballers
Rangers F.C. players
Dunfermline Athletic F.C. players
Aberdeen F.C. players
Berwick Rangers F.C. players
Berwick Rangers F.C. managers
Dunfermline Athletic F.C. managers
Association football forwards
Scottish Football League players
Scottish Football League managers
Footballers from Edinburgh